True North Calling is a Canadian documentary television series, which debuted on CBC Television on February 17, 2017. Produced by Proper Television, the six-part series profiles several young Canadians living in the Canadian Arctic territories of Northwest Territories, Yukon and Nunavut.

Production 
True North Calling was produced by Proper Television with executive producer Allison Grace. According to Grace, they sought to show "a cross-section of Northerners, each doing different things directly  connected to the land and culture". They wanted to cover each of the three territories – Northwest Territories, Yukon and Nunavut – to show the differing landscapes and cultures.

The series was filmed over ten months in the Canadian territories. The shoot was expensive due to the remote locations, availability of local film crews, and effects of the climate on equipment and schedules. On some days of the shoot, there were fewer than three hours of daylight.

Subjects 

The series focuses on six people and their livelihoods in Canada's far north:
Franco Buscemi, the general manager of a fuel depot in Iqaluit, Nunavut, who hunts, performs stand-up comedy, and plans to run for public office
Kylik Kisoun Taylor, a tour operator in Inuvik, Northwest Territories, who mixes cultural traditions with shrewd marketing
Shawn Buckley, a third-generation fisherman and single parent in Yellowknife, Northwest Territories
Kate Mechan and Bart Bounds, sustainable farmers outside of Whitehorse, Yukon, starting their family off the grid
Stacey Aglok MacDonald, a television producer in Iqaluit, who seeks to make a comedy series in the Inuktitut language.

Episodes

Release
True North Calling was announced as part of CBC Television's "most ambitious, diverse programming" schedule for the 150th anniversary of Canada in 2017.

Reception

Greg David of  found that the series succeeded in showing the difficulties of living in the arctic and the people who take on the challenge, with "glorious views" of the arctic landscape. Writing for The Toronto Star, David Korb felt the series provided "fascinating insight" into how people live in Canada's north. Chris Lackner of the Winnipeg Free Press wrote that the series provided "a candid look at inspiring lives".

McGill University Professor Marianne Stenbaek, an expert in Nunavik literature and the northern regions, felt that the series showed "northerners' ingenuity and diversity" in the modern north. She felt that the series was overdue, and provided an optimistic view to balance news coverage which focused on social problems such as alcoholism, suicide, and housing shortages.

References

External links
Remarks on the show from participant Kylik Kisoun Taylor, at Tundra North Tours

CBC Television original programming
2017 Canadian television series debuts
2017 Canadian television series endings
2010s Canadian documentary television series